Ballhaus may refer to:

People
Michael Ballhaus (1935–2017), German cinematographer
Florian Ballhaus German cinematographer
William F. Ballhaus, Jr. American engineer
William F. Ballhaus, Sr. (1918–2013), American engineer
William L. Ballhaus, American business executive

Other
 German word to indicate a space for playing real tennis